Second Avenue is located on the East Side of the New York City borough of Manhattan extending from Houston Street at its south end to the Harlem River Drive at 128th Street at its north end. A one-way street, vehicular traffic on Second Avenue runs southbound (downtown) only, except for a one-block segment of the avenue in Harlem. South of Houston Street, the roadway continues as Chrystie Street south to Canal Street.

A bicycle lane runs in the leftmost lane of Second Avenue from 125th to Houston Streets. The section from 55th to 34th Streets closes a gap in the Manhattan Waterfront Greenway.

Second Avenue passes through a number of Manhattan neighborhoods including (from south to north) the Lower East Side, the East Village, Stuyvesant Square, Kips Bay, Tudor City, Turtle Bay, East Midtown, Lenox Hill, Yorkville and Spanish Harlem.

History

Downtown Second Avenue in the Lower East Side was the home to many Yiddish theatre productions during the early part of the 20th century, and Second Avenue came to be known as the "Yiddish Theater District", "Yiddish Broadway", or the "Jewish Rialto". Although the theaters are gone, many traces of Jewish immigrant culture remain, such as kosher delicatessens and bakeries, and the famous Second Avenue Deli (which closed in 2006, later reopening on East 33rd Street and Third Avenue).

The Second Avenue Elevated train line ran above Second Avenue the full length of the avenue north of 23rd Street, and stood from 1880 until service was ended on June 13, 1942. South of Second Avenue, it ran on First Avenue and then Allen and Division Street. The elevated trains were noisy and often dirty (in the 19th century they were pulled by soot-spewing steam locomotives). This depressed land values along Second Avenue during the late 19th and early 20th centuries. Partially because of the presence of the El, most buildings constructed during this era were working class tenements. The line was finally torn down in 1942 because it was deteriorated and obsolete, and the cost of World War II made upkeep impossible. Second Avenue maintains its modest architectural character today, despite running through a number of high income areas.

Second Avenue has carried one-way traffic since June 4, 1951, before which it carried traffic in both the northbound and southbound directions.

2015 gas explosion 

On March 26, 2015, a gas explosion and resulting fire in the East Village destroyed three buildings at 119, 121 and 123 Second Avenue, between East 7th Street and St. Mark's Place. At least twenty-two people were injured, four critically, and two people were initially listed as missing. Later, two men were found dead in the debris of the explosion and were confirmed to be the ones listed as missing. There had previously been an illegal tap installed into the gas line feeding 121 Second Avenue. In the days before the explosion, work was ongoing in the building for the installation of a new 4-inch gas line to service the apartments in 121, and some of the tenants had smelled gas an hour before the explosion.

Eleven other buildings were evacuated as a result of the explosion, and Con Ed turned off the gas to the area. Several days later, some residents were allowed to return to some of the vacated buildings.

Transportation

Bus service

The M15 local serves the entirety of Second Avenue. The M15 Select Bus Service, the Select Bus Service equivalent of the local M15 bus, provides bus rapid transit service along Second Avenue southbound. Additionally, the M34A Select Bus Service runs along Second Avenue between East 34th Street and East 23rd Street en route to Waterside Plaza.

Subway

The  serves Second Avenue from 96th Street to 72nd Street before turning onto 63rd Street with a stop at Lexington Avenue, which has an exit at Third Avenue. A Second Avenue Subway line has been planned since 1919, with provisions to construct it as early as 1929.

Two short sections of the line have been completed over the years, serving other subway services (the Grand Street station is served by the ), and others simply sitting vacant underground (such as the unused upper level at the Second Avenue station on the ). Portions have been leased from time to time by New York Telephone to house equipment serving the company's principal north-south communication lines which run under the Avenue. Isolated 1970s-era segments of the line, built without any infrastructure, exist between Pell and Canal Streets, and between 99th–105th and 110th–120th Streets. Construction on Phase 1, which will eventually extend from 125th Street to the Financial District via the  service, began on April 12, 2007. Phase 1 opened on January 1, 2017. Phase 2, which would extend the line to East Harlem at 125th Street and Lexington Avenue, is expected to be completed between 2027 and 2029. When the whole Second Avenue subway line is completed, it is projected to serve about 560,000 daily riders.

Bike lane

There are bike lanes along the avenue south of 125th Street.

References

External links

 New York Songlines: Second Avenue, a virtual walking tour

 
Jews and Judaism in Manhattan
02
Yiddish theatre in the United States
East Harlem
East Village, Manhattan
Kips Bay, Manhattan
Midtown Manhattan
Murray Hill, Manhattan
Upper East Side